DCD may refer to:

Companies and organizations
 DCD (company), a South African heavy engineering company
 DCD Media, a television production and distribution company
 Detroit Country Day School, a private school in Beverly Hills, Michigan
 Diamond Comic Distributors, the largest distributor of comic books in the United States
 Dubai Civil Defence, an Emergency Management Organization of Dubai, United Arab Emirates

Science and medicine 
 2-Cyanoguanidine, a fertilizer also known as dicyandiamide
 Developmental coordination disorder also known as developmental dyspraxia, a type of motor learning difficulty
 Dermcidin, an anti-microbial peptide released by human sweat glands
 Donation after Circulatory Death (or Donation after Cardiac Death), donation of organs after clinical death

Other
 Data Carrier Detect, a term used with modems and the RS-232 interface
 Dead Can Dance, a musical duo from Australia
 Def Con Dos, a Spanish rap metal band
 Deseret Chemical Depot, a U.S. Army chemical weapon storage area in Utah
 Double crossover diamond interchange, a type of highway interchange
 Dual currency deposit, a derivative instrument